The Lithuanian People's Party is a left-wing political party in Lithuania. The party has had seven representatives at the municipal level but no seats in either the Seimas or EP. The founder of the party, Kazimira Prunskienė, was the first prime minister of independent Lithuania.

The party signed a cooperation agreement with the biggest party in Russia, United Russia, soon after its establishment and has been in active collaboration ever since.

The party participated in parliamentary elections in 2016 and 2020. It was the only political party during the 2020 election which supported the withdrawal of Lithuania from the European Union.

References

Eurosceptic parties in Lithuania
Russophilia
Nationalist parties in Lithuania
Conservative parties in Lithuania
Socialist parties in Lithuania